Beverly Browne Douglas (December 21, 1822 – December 22, 1878) was a U.S. Representative from Virginia.

Early life
Born at Providence Forge, Virginia, Douglas attended Rumford Academy in King William County. In his college years, he attended the College of William and Mary, Williamsburg, Virginia, Yale College, and the University of Edinburgh, Scotland. Upon his return to the United States reentered William and Mary, and graduated from the law department in 1843.

Career
He was admitted to the bar in 1844 and commenced practice in Norfolk, Virginia, then moved to King William County, Virginia in 1846 and continued the practice of his profession.

He served as delegate to the Virginia Constitutional Convention of 1850. He was one of five elected from a House of Delegates district that included his home county of King William, as well as Caroline, Spotsylvania, and Hanover Counties.

Douglas served as member of the Senate of Virginia during the period 1852–1865. He served as presidential elector for the Democratic ticket of Breckinridge and Lane in 1860.

During the Civil War, he entered the Confederate States Army as first lieutenant in Lee's Rangers, and was successively promoted to the rank of major of the Fifth Virginia Cavalry.

Douglas was elected as a Democrat to the Forty-fourth and Forty-fifth Congresses and served from March 4, 1875, until his death in Washington, D.C., December 22, 1878.

Death
Beverly Browne Douglas was interred in the family burying ground at "Zoar," near Aylett, Virginia.

Elections
1874; Douglas was first elected to the U.S. House of Representatives with 50.69% of the vote, defeating Republican James Beverley Sener.
1876; Douglas was re-elected with 56.53% of the vote, defeating Republican L.C. Boiston.

See also
List of United States Congress members who died in office (1790–1899)

References

Bibliography

1822 births
1878 deaths
Virginia lawyers
Democratic Party Virginia state senators
Democratic Party members of the United States House of Representatives from Virginia
People from New Kent County, Virginia
College of William & Mary alumni
Yale College alumni
Alumni of the University of Edinburgh
People of Virginia in the American Civil War
People from King William County, Virginia
Confederate States Army officers
19th-century American politicians